Garin de Monglane is a fictional aristocrat who gives his name to the second cycle of Old French chansons de geste, La Geste de Garin de Monglane. His cycle tells stories of fiefless lads of noble birth who went off seeking land and adventure fighting the Saracens.

The several heroes who rode off seeking war and wealth in this way are given genealogies that made Garin de Monglane their common ancestor. Apart from fathering a race of landless knights, Garin de Monglane himself is a character whose portrait in the poems is otherwise drawn very sketchily. Poems belonging to the Garin cycle include the chansons of Girart de Vienne, Aimeri de Narbonne, and Guillaume. Of these poems, Aimeri de Narbonne has the largest literary interest.

References

See also 
 Matter of France
 Girart de Roussillon
 Franco-Provençal language

Fictional French people
Male characters in literature
Fictional knights
Matter of France
Chansons de geste